George Chisholm OBE (29 March 1915 – 6 December 1997) was a Scottish jazz trombonist and vocalist.

In the late 1930s he moved to London, where he played in dance bands led by Bert Ambrose and Teddy Joyce. He later recorded with jazz musicians such as Coleman Hawkins, Fats Waller and Benny Carter during their visits to the UK.

In 1940, during the Second World War, Chisholm signed on with the Royal Air Force and joined the RAF Dance Orchestra (known popularly as the Squadronaires), remaining in the band long after he was demobbed. He followed this with freelance work and a five-year stint with the BBC Showband (a forerunner of the BBC Radio Orchestra) and as a core member of Wally Stott's orchestra on BBC Radio's The Goon Show, for which he made several minor acting appearances, for example as 'Chisholm MacChisholm the Steaming Celt' in the 1956 episode 'The Macreekie Rising of '74'.

Chisholm had roles in the films The Mouse on the Moon (1963), The Knack ...and How to Get It (1965) and Superman III (1983). He was also part of the house band for the children's programmes Play School and Play Away. He also sang and was a storyteller on Play School occasionally.

During the 1980s Chisholm continued to play, despite undergoing heart surgery; working with his own band the Gentlemen of Jazz and Keith Smith's Hefty Jazz among others, and playing live with touring artists. He was appointed an OBE in 1984.

In the mid-1990s, Chisholm retired from public life suffering from Alzheimer's disease. He died in December 1997, aged 82.

References

External links
 
 George Chisholm's Life Story  Gentleman of Jazz - George Chisholm's life story
 George Chisholm 1976 interview with Les Tomkins (1) George Chisholm - Hand Over Mouth
 George Chisholm 1976 interview with Les Tomkins (2) George Chisholm - Spike (Spike Milligan)

Scottish jazz trombonists
Male trombonists
Scottish male radio actors
Scottish male film actors
Musicians from Glasgow
Officers of the Order of the British Empire
1915 births
1997 deaths
20th-century Scottish male actors
20th-century Scottish musicians
20th-century trombonists
Royal Air Force airmen
Royal Air Force personnel of World War II
20th-century British male musicians
British male jazz musicians
The Squadronaires members
Black Lion Records artists